El Chico is a restaurant chain in the Southern United States. The first restaurant opened in 1940 in Oak Lawn, in Dallas, Texas. There are 78 locations. The restaurant serves a variety of Tex-Mex dishes.

History
The restaurant's origin was Adelaida "Mama" Cuellar's popular homemade tamales at a county fair in 1926. Two years later, Cuellar opened Cuellar's Cafe in Kaufman, Texas. Her sons opened a cafe in Dallas using her recipes. The 11th Cuellar restaurant was located at Six Flags Over Texas amusement park, which was owned by Adelaida Cuellar's husband's employer, Angus Wynne. Today, it is part of Consolidated Restaurant Operations, Inc. (CRO) Joe V. Carvajal was an integral part of the success of many of the el Chico restaurants in the 1960s and '70s. He introduced the sopapilla to Tex-Mex and American cuisine.

References

External links
Official website

Companies based in Dallas
Restaurants in Texas
Economy of the Southeastern United States
Economy of the Southwestern United States
Regional restaurant chains in the United States
Restaurants established in 1940
Mexican restaurants in the United States